Pebre is a Chilean condiment made of coriander and/or parsley, chopped onion, vinegar, a neutral oil, ground or pureed spicy aji peppers, and usually chopped tomatoes. Pebre is most commonly used on bread. It is also used on meat, or when meat such as choripán is provided in a bread roll. In far northern Chile, the term pebre refers to a sauce more like Bolivian llajwa.

History

The word pebre in Catalan means pepper of any type, in this case ají cultivars of chilli pepper. In the rest of Spain, it refers to a sauce made of vinegar, pepper, saffron, clove, and other spices.

The origin of Pebre as a sauce in Chile dates to the arrival of Catalan engineers and highly skilled masons under the supervision of the Italian  architect Joaquin Toesca, for the construction of the Tajamares de Santiago, the fluvial channels, river walls and bridges for the main river that intersects the city of Santiago, the Rio Mapocho (Mapocho River). Catalan workers made a simple sauce (salsa) with cilantro, oil, vinegar and salt, called Pebre for its main ingredient, the ají.

Similar International Variations
In Brazil, a similar sauce can be found by the name of Vinagrete (which is less hot than Pebre due to the lack of peppers in it). This sauce is one of the most popular sauces in Brazilian churrascos.

In Mexico, a similar sauce called pico de gallo is commonly used for cochinita pibil tacos, among other preparations. Like pebre, pico de gallo is also made with onion, coriander and tomato.

In the Dominican Republic, there is a similar sauce called wasakaka, which usually contains lime or sour orange juice.

See also
 Pico de gallo
 Vinagrete
 List of tomato dishes

References

Chilean condiments
Chili pepper dishes